The 1991 Arena Football League season was the fifth season of the Arena Football League (AFL). The league champions were the Tampa Bay Storm, who defeated the Detroit Drive in ArenaBowl V.

Standings

y – clinched regular-season title

x – clinched playoff spot

Playoffs

Awards and honors

Regular season awards

All-Arena team

Team notes

References